Lweza Football Club  (Lweza FC) is a football club, based in Kampala. They played their home games at the Mutessa 2 Royal stadium in Wankuluku.

History
LWEZA football Club competes in the Uganda’s top flight Premier League. The Kajjansi based side was founded in 1990 with a purpose to provide a premier-level soccer experience through the application of professional training and player development programs, built upon the international guidelines.
LWEZA Football Club develops the youth through the game of soccer, connecting them from diverse socio-economic backgrounds, imparting life lessons and fostering cross-generational relationships. 
they strive to build a foundation for soccer excellence; enabling players to continue to build along the development pathway to the highest level of soccer competition. - See more at: http://www.lwezafc.ug/the-team/#sthash.CbTXrOrf.dpuf.

Established in 1990 Lweza football Club has developed into one of the largest and successful sports clubs in Uganda. With over 70 players In both professional and youth teams, Lweza football Club takes great pride in the development of players at all levels and provides an opportunity for participants to play the sport they love.
Lweza football continues to attract more players every season and in addition to skill development, club players reap the lifelong benefits of aerobic conditioning, increased self-esteem and an understanding of "teamwork". Football delivers a high level of excitement and requires skill and energy from its players. Young players, are drawn to the challenge and fun of the game with a great number of registered participants, soccer in central Uganda is continuing to grow in popularity as a sport for all ages.
Tradition at Lweza football club has been built over decades of success and now is the time for your business to be a part of this tradition.

LWEZA FC is a none-profit association that works in conjunction with committee members, players, volunteers, coaches and managers to provide a football club for the whole community. It relies on volunteers for its success and all money raised is used to benefit the club and the surrounding community.

Current status
The past two seasons have been among the most exciting in the club’s history. 2012 involved building on the strong foundations laid by the board of management of the previous season. In 2012 Lweza FC won the FUFA regionals club, 2013/14 was Lweza FC’s cup year

Achievements
FUFA REGIONALS CUP
Winner (1 time): 2013
FUFA BIG LEAGUE
Runner-up (1 time): 2014

External links
 http://www.lwezafc.ug

Sport in Kampala
Football clubs in Uganda